Kuitpo  is a locality in the Alexandrina Council area.

The 2016 Australian census which was conducted in August 2016 reports that Kuitpo had a population of 196 people.

See also
 Hundred of Kuitpo

References

Towns in South Australia